Francisca Muñoz de León Moral (born 30 December 1993) is a Spanish sport shooter.

She participated at the 2018 ISSF World Shooting Championships, winning a medal.

References

External links

Living people
1993 births
Spanish female sport shooters
Trap and double trap shooters
21st-century Spanish women